The boys' 800 metre freestyle event at the 2018 Summer Youth Olympics took place on 11 October at the Natatorium in Buenos Aires, Argentina.

Results
The heats were started at 10:00 and 18:00.

References

Swimming at the 2018 Summer Youth Olympics